Seven tennis events were held at the 1991 Pan American Games in Havana, Cuba, including a team event for the first time.

Medalists

By Country
(Host nation in bold.)

Men's singles

Women's singles

Men's doubles

Women's doubles

Mixed doubles

Men's team

Women's team

Pan American Games
1991
Events at the 1991 Pan American Games
Panamerican Games